Dennis Norman Heussner (born 20 October 1943 in Albury, New South Wales) is an Australian sprint canoeist who competed in the early to mid-1970s. Competing in two Summer Olympics, he was eliminated in the semifinals of the K-4 1000 m event in both 1972 and 1976.

Dennis was for a period of time the leading gold medalist at the Australian Surf Lifesaving titles. He finished his career as the most successful long board paddler, and a leading malibu, malibu relay, ski, double ski and ski relay champion.

Dennis was succeeded by his son Kane and daughter Holly who won numerous Australian and New South Wales title individually and claimed three Australian Mixed Double ski titles together.

References
 Sports-reference.com profile

1943 births
Australian male canoeists
Canoeists at the 1972 Summer Olympics
Canoeists at the 1976 Summer Olympics
Living people
Olympic canoeists of Australia
Sportspeople from Albury
Sportsmen from New South Wales
20th-century Australian people
21st-century Australian people